Fox (sometimes known as Fox Channel) was a German pay television channel dedicated to television drama series. It relied heavily on American and British drama series.

History
On 10 March 2008, News Corporation applied for a broadcasting license for Fox International Channels Germany GmbH from MABB, the media authority for the Berlin Brandenburg region. The channel was greenlit a month later. It was launched on 19 May 2008 exclusively on satellite-television provider Premiere.

On 1 April 2009, the channel changed its aspect ratio from 4:3 to 16:9 widescreen. In October 2010, it launched its own HD feed, broadcasting at 1080i.

In November 2011, FOX bought pay-TV rights to rerun the first two seasons of legal drama The Good Wife. After a successful run, FOX bought the rights to show new episodes, starting with season three. The free-TV rights were with ProSiebenSat.1 Media which planned to broadcast the third season to be shown on sixx. However, season three was released on DVD with no free-to-air television broadcasts.
On 10 July 2013, The Bridge premiered on FOX after a rerun of the original.

Closure
On 6 July 2021, it was announced that Fox, along with Disney Junior would close in Germany on 30 September 2021, simultaneously with the discontinuation of Asian version and African version of the channel, with most of its content shifting to Star content hub on Disney+.

Programming 
Series broadcast on the channel included:

11.22.63 (11.22.63 - Der Anschlag) (2016–2021)
American Horror Story (2011–2021) (Now on Disney+)
Ashes to Ashes (2009-2013)
Atlanta (2016–2021) (Now on Disney+)
Blue Bloods (2012–2021)
Chris Ryan's Strike Back (Strike Back) (2011–2021)
Curb Your Enthusiasm (Lass es, Larry!) (2008-2010)
Da Vinci's Demons (2013–2019) (Now on Disney+)
Death in Paradise (2012–2021) (Now on Disney+)
Den fördömde (Sebastian Bergman - Spuren des Todes) (2016–2021)
Dirty Sexy Money (2008-2010) (Now on Disney+)
Drop Dead Diva (2010-2016)
Doctor Who (Revived series) (2011–2021) (Coming soon on Disney+)
Emergence (2019-2021)
Entourage (2008-2013)
Epitafios (Epitafios - Tod ist die Antwort) (2009-2013)
Genius (2017–2021) (Now on Disney+)
Hart of Dixie (2014–2017)
Hawaii Five-O (2010) (2012–2021)
Hotel Babylon (2009-2010)
Kojak (2012–2015)
Las Vegas (2008-2010)
Law & Order: UK
Law & Order: Special Victims Unit
Legion (2017–2021) (Now on Disney+)
Longmire (2014–2021)
Lost (2008-2011) (Now on Disney+)
Magnum, P.I. (Magnum) (2013-2014)
Medium (2008-2013)
Nashville (2013–2021)
Navy CIS (2012–2021)
Navy CIS: L.A. (2016–2021)
Outcast (2016–2021)
Pod Prikritie (Undercover) (2014–2021)
Prison Break (2017–2021) (Now on Disney+)
Providence (2008-2010)
Ray Donovan (2014-2017)
Salamander (2013-2016)
Shameless (2012–2021)
Skins (2009-2012)
Sleepy Hollow (2014–2021) (Now on Disney+)
Snowfall (2018–2021) (Now on Disney+)
Suits (2013–2021)
The Big C (The Big C ... und jetzt ich!) (2011-2015)
The Defenders (2012–2013) 
The Gifted (2018–2021) (Now on Disney+)
The Good Fight (2017–2021) (Now on Disney+)
The Good Wife (2011–2019)
The Guardian (The Guardian - Retter mit Herz) (2010-2013)
The Night Shift (2014–2021)
The Sopranos (Die Sopranos) (2008-2010)
The Walking Dead (2010–2021) (Now on Disney+)
The West Wing (2008-2012)
Wayward Pines (2015–2021) (Now on Disney+)

Audience share

Germany

References

External links

Germany
Television stations in Germany
Television stations in Austria
Television stations in Switzerland
German-language television stations
Television channels and stations established in 2008
Television channels and stations disestablished in 2021
2008 establishments in Germany
2021 disestablishments in Germany
Mass media in Munich